Tomás Tierney (born 14 September 1961) is an Irish former Gaelic footballer who played at senior level for the Galway and Mayo county teams in the 1980s and 1990s. He played his club football for Milltown.

Tierney helped St Jarlath's College in Tuam win the Hogan Cup in 1978, as well as winning three Sigerson Cups with  University College Galway in 1980/81, 1982/83 and 1983/84, captaining the side in 1984. In 1981 he was a member of the Galway team who were beaten in the All-Ireland Under 21 Football Championship final by Cork after a replay. He played on the Galway team who were beaten by Dublin in the 1983 All-Ireland Senior Football Championship Final. He also played football for Mayo in the early 1990s, becoming one of very few people to win Connacht medals with both Galway and Mayo.

Honours
 St Jarlath's College, Tuam
Connacht Colleges Senior Football Championship : (2) 1978, 1979
 Hogan Cup : (1) 1978
Runner-up : (1) 1979

 Milltown
 Galway Senior Football Championship : (1) 1981
Runner-up : (2) 1986, 1987

UCG
Sigerson Cup : (3) 1980/81, 1982/83, 1983/84 (capt.)
Runner-up : (1) 1981/82

Galway
Connacht Under-21 Football Championship : (1) 1981
Connacht Senior Football Championship : (5) 1982, 1983, 1984, 1986 (capt.), 1987

Mayo
Connacht Senior Football Championship : (2) 1992, 1993
Runner-up : (1) 1991

References

1961 births
Living people
Galway inter-county Gaelic footballers
Mayo inter-county Gaelic footballers
Milltown Gaelic footballers
University of Galway Gaelic footballers
People educated at St Jarlath's College